Notre-Dame de l'Assomption Abbey is a Trappist/Cistercian monastery located in Rogersville, New Brunswick, Canada.

The monastery dates back to the beginning of the 20th century. Due to religious persecution, a group of Cistercian nuns emigrated to Canada in 1904, from a Cistercian monastery located in Vaise (Lyon), France (which had been founded in 1817) in order to reestablish their monastic community in Rogersville.  Their new abbey was established 3.5 kilometres south of Notre Dame du Calvaire Abbey, a monastery established by another group of Trappist monks who had arrived in 1902.

The nuns arrived in May and took possession of their new provisional monastery - a small farmhouse of six rooms for 19 people - on June 10 of that year. Those early years were full of struggles as the nuns adapted to the Canadian climate, a rural lifestyle and the daunting task of building up a monastery from the humble beginnings of that farm house.

With the generous aid of the local people and their pastor, Mgr. Marcel François Richard, the nuns not only persevered but were eventually joined by many Acadian women desirous of the monastic lifestyle and, little by little, a flourishing monastic community was established, replete with an Abbey church built in 1922, the present monastic complex built in 1950 and a retreat house for women opened in 1970.

Over the years, the nuns gained their livelihood through different endeavours: at first by making Mass wine, then through the fabrication of Altar Breads (hosts). The altar bread industry has been modernized and today several types and sizes of hosts are made and sold throughout the Maritime parishes. Most importantly, however, the Trappistine nuns have lived a life of prayer and intercession by their faithful celebration of the Liturgy, consisting of prayer services dispersed throughout the day, with its climax in the Eucharist.

External links
Notre-Dame de l'Assomption Abbey

Trappist monasteries in Canada
Buildings and structures in Northumberland County, New Brunswick
Catholic Church in New Brunswick
1904 establishments in New Brunswick